Lidón is a municipality located in the province of Teruel, Aragon, Spain. According to the 2010 census the municipality has a population of 57 inhabitants.

See also
Comunidad de Teruel
List of municipalities in Teruel

References

External links 
CAI Aragón - Lidón
Sierra de Lidón

Municipalities in the Province of Teruel